"Disco Lies" is a song by American electronica musician Moby. It was released as the first single from his eighth studio album Last Night on January 21, 2008. The female vocals are provided by Shayna Steele.

Release 
"Disco Lies" was released as a single onto the US iTunes Store market on January 21, 2008. It was released in Europe as the first single from Last Night, and well as the United Kingdom as a remix version by Freemasons.

The single also features the track "Clef", in which the vocals are an unknown woman counting in German.

Music video 
The music video for the song was directed by Evan Bernard and premiered on February 14, 2008. The video follows the story of a baby chick who at a young age escapes from a chicken farm, witnessing the slaughtering of his friends and kin. The video then shows ten years later (acclimated at the late 1970s) when the chicken has grown up and is out for vengeance for the killing of his friends. Dressed as a pimp, the chicken enters into an "MFC" fast food restaurant (a reference to KFC) and seeks out the owner of the franchise (played by Moby), a man dressed in white with a beard and cowboy hat (a clear reference to KFC's Colonel Sanders). After disposing of the owner's two bodyguards, the chicken chases the owner until he eventually corners him in the slaughterhouse where his friends were killed and beheads the owner with the same knife used to kill his kin. The video is likely the product of Moby's veganism and strong animal rights activism, as it makes a strong statement against the meat industry.

There are two versions of the video, one censored and the other uncensored. Firstly, the chicken slaughter scene is cut in the censored version. Secondly, in the scene where the chicken finally kills the Colonel, his death is indicated by the blood splattering over the MFC's poster in the uncensored version. The censored version just shows the poster. Finally, at the last scene, the colonel's leg meat is on the dish is shown in the uncensored, whilst the colonel's hand meat in the bucket (as if it was part of the fried chicken) is shown for the censored video.

Track listing 

 CD single 
 "Disco Lies" – 3:23
 "Clef" – 3:34
 CD single 
 "Disco Lies" – 3:23
 "Clef" – 3:34
 "Disco Lies"  – 6:14
 "Disco Lies"  – 6:36
 "Disco Lies"  – 5:59
 "Disco Lies"  – 6:34
 "Disco Lies"  – 9:04
 "Disco Lies"  – 3:26
 Digital single
 "Disco Lies" – 3:22
 "Clef" – 3:34
 "Disco Lies"  – 6:14
 "Disco Lies"  – 6:36
 "Disco Lies"  – 5:59
 "Disco Lies"  – 6:34
 "Disco Lies"  – 9:04

 Digital single
 "Disco Lies"  – 6:13
 "Disco Lies"  – 7:05
 "Disco Lies"  – 6:34
 "Disco Lies"  – 6:34
 "Disco Lies"  – 3:34
 "Disco Lies"  – 7:16
 "Disco Lies"  – 5:54
 "Disco Lies"  – 5:58
 "Disco Lies"  – 9:04
 CD single 
 "Disco Lies"  – 3:31
 "Disco Lies"  – 3:34
 12-inch single 
 "Disco Lies"  – 9:04
 "Disco Lies"  – 6:34
 "Disco Lies"  – 6:13
 "Disco Lies"  – 9:04
 Digital single – remixes
 "Disco Lies"  – 9:04
 "Disco Lies"  – 7:05
 "Disco Lies"  – 7:16
 "Disco Lies"  – 9:04

Charts

Weekly charts

Year-end charts

References

External links 
 
 

2008 singles
Moby songs
Mute Records singles
2008 songs
Songs written by Moby